Saint Germanus or Saint Germanicus may refer to:

Germanicus of Smyrna (died 155), saint and martyr
Germanus (Cermanus, died 305), Spanish martyr-saint (see Servandus and Cermanus)
Germanus of Auxerre (378–448), bishop of Auxerre who founded the Abbey of Saint-Germain d'Auxerre
Germanus of Normandy (died 480),  also known as Germanus the Scot
Germanus of Capua (died 541), archbishop
Germanus of Paris (496-576), also Saint Germain of Paris
Germanus of Granfelden (died 675), Saint
Germanus I of Constantinople (died ), 39th Patriarch of Constantinople
Sanctus Germanus, a titular see of the Roman Catholic Church

See also
Germanus (disambiguation)
Saint-Germain (disambiguation)
San Germano (disambiguation)
St Germans (disambiguation)